Jack Gardner Boultbee (April 23, 1907 – August 1, 1980) was a Canadian sailor who competed in the 1932 Summer Olympics. In 1932 he was a crew member of the Canadian boat Caprice which won the bronze medal in the 6 metre class.

References

profile

1907 births
1980 deaths
Canadian male sailors (sport)
Olympic bronze medalists for Canada
Olympic sailors of Canada
Sailors at the 1932 Summer Olympics – 6 Metre
Olympic medalists in sailing
Medalists at the 1932 Summer Olympics
20th-century Canadian people